Carl Otto Schutte (October 5, 1887 – June 24, 1962) was an American road racing cyclist who competed in the 1912 Summer Olympics. He won two bronze medals, one in the individual time trial and another in the team time trial.

References

External links
 
 
 

1887 births
1962 deaths
American male cyclists
American people of German descent
Cyclists at the 1912 Summer Olympics
Olympic bronze medalists for the United States in cycling
Medalists at the 1912 Summer Olympics